Leonard Hokanson (August 13, 1931 – March 21, 2003) was an American pianist who achieved prominence in Europe as a soloist and chamber musician.

Early life and education
Born in Vinalhaven, Maine, he attended Clark University in Worcester, Massachusetts and Bennington College in Vermont, where he received a master of arts degree with a major in music. He made his concert debut with the Philadelphia Orchestra at the age of eighteen. He was drafted into the U.S. Army after graduate school, and in December 1955, he was a private performing in the 11th Airborne Division Band at Fort Campbell, Kentucky. Later, he was posted to Augsburg, Germany.

Career
He achieved early recognition as a performer in Europe, serving as a soloist with such orchestras as the Berlin Philharmonic, the Rotterdam Philharmonic, and the Vienna Symphony. He was awarded the Steinway Prize of Boston and was a prizewinner at the Busoni International Piano Competition in Bolzano, Italy. His numerous international music festival appearances included Aldeburgh, Berlin, Echternach, Lucerne, Prague, Ravinia, Salzburg, Schleswig-Holstein, Tanglewood, and Vienna.

One of the last pupils of Artur Schnabel, Hokanson also studied with Karl-Ulrich Schnabel, Claude Frank, and Julian DeGray. He was professor of piano at the Frankfurt University of Music and Performing Arts for ten years before taking a position as professor of piano at the Indiana University Jacobs School of Music in Bloomington in 1986. He was also a permanent guest professor at the Tokyo College of Music.

He was a founding member of the Odeon Trio and as a chamber musician performed with such ensembles as the Vermeer Quartet, the St. Lawrence Quartet, the Ensemble Villa Musica, and the Wind Soloists of the Berlin Philharmonic and frequently performed duo recitals with the violinist Miriam Fried, the clarinetist James Campbell, and the horn player Hermann Baumann. As a pianist for song recitals, he played with numerous singers, including Martina Arroyo, Grace Bumbry, Melanie Diener, Edith Mathis, Edda Moser, and Hermann Prey. His collaboration with Prey extended over 25 years. He was also resident pianist with Bay Chamber Concerts in Rockport, Maine.

Hokanson's many recordings include the complete piano works of Walter Piston, Haydn sonatas, Mozart concertos, and Brahms intermezzi, as well as Schubert's complete works for violin and piano with Edith Peinemann, Brahms' sonatas for clarinet and piano with James Campbell, Beethoven's complete songs with Hermann Prey and Pamela Coburn, the complete piano trios of Brahms, Dvořák, and Schubert (Odeon Trio), previously unrecorded early piano works of Schubert, and Norbert Burgmüller's Concerto for Piano and Orchestra.

In 2001 Hokanson became professor emeritus at Indiana University but continued teaching solo piano, chamber music, and a German art song class at the school until his death in Bloomington, Indiana, from pancreatic cancer on March 21, 2003.

Discography

Harpsichord
Bach
Brandenburg Concerto Nr. 5 (Philips)
Musical Offering (Erato, Musical Heritage)
Orchestra Suites (Classette)
Concertos for Oboe/Oboe and Violin (Erato)
Telemann
Fantasies for Harpsichord (Philips)
St. Mark Passion (Philips)
St. Matthew Passion (Philips)

Baroque Airs and Adagios (Philips)

Il Canone di Pachelbel, Telemann, Vivaldi, etc. (Erato)

Solo Piano
Beethoven/Liszt
Symphony Nr. 8 (transcribed for piano) (Deutsche Grammophon Archiv)
Brahms
Intermezzi Op. 117, 118, 119; Scherzo Op. 4 (Bayer)
Burgmüller
Concerto for Piano and Orchestra (MDG)
Haydn
Piano Sonatas (Bayer)
Mozart
Piano Concerto in E-flat, K. 271 (Bayer)
Piano Concertos in E-flat, K. 271 and G, K. 453 (Capriccio, Pilz)
Piston
Complete Works for Piano (Northeastern)
Schubert
Sonata in A, Op.Posth. (RCA)
"Grazer" Fantasy (Bärenreiter)
The Young Schubert (Northeastern)

Chamber Music
Bach
Sonatas for Cello and Piano (Angelica May) (Musicaphon)
David Baker
Sonata for Clarinet and Piano (James Campbell) (Cala)
Beethoven
Sonata for Piano and Cello, Op.102/1; Variations for Piano and Cello (Angelica May) (Musicaphon)
Works for Flute and Piano (Kurt Redel) (Pierre Verany label)
Piano Trios Op.70/1 and 2 (Odeon Trio) (Musicaphon)
Piano Trios (Salzburg Mozart Trio/Fortepiano) (Harmonia Mundi, Musical Heritage)
Beethoven, Czerny, Kruft, Strauss
Works for Horn and Piano (Hermann Baumann) (Philips)
Brahms
Complete Sonatas for Violin and Piano (Jenny Abel) (Harmonia Mundi)
Piano Trios (Odeon Trio and Rainer Moog) (RCA, Quintessence, Musical Heritage, Capriccio)
Brahms, Franck
Sonatas for Cello and Piano (Angelica May) (Musicaphon)
Brahms, Genzmer
Piano Trios (Odeon Trio) (Impression)
Brahms, Jenner
Sonatas for Clarinet and Piano (James Campbell) (Marquis Classics)
Brahms, Shostakovich
Piano Trios (Odeon Trio) (Impression)
Chopin, Martinu
Sonatas for Cello and Piano (Angelica May) (Musicaphon)
Dvořák
Piano Trios and Quartets (Odeon Trio and Rainer Moog) (RCA, Pro Arte)
Bernhard Heiden
Sonata for Piano, Four Hands (Cordula Hacke) (Cadenza)
Mozart
6 Piano Trios (Salzburg Mozart Trio/Fortepiano) (Harmonia Mundi, Musical Heritage)
Early Piano Trios, K. 10–15 (Salzburg Mozart Trio/Fortepiano) (Musical Heritage)
Piano Quartets (Salzburg Mozart Trio and Jürgen Geise/Fortepiano) (Musicaphon, Musical Heritage)
Pflüger
Impeto (Hermann Baumann) (Bayer)
Piston
Piano Quintet (Portland String Quartet) (Northeastern)
Saint-Saëns
Chamber Music for Winds (Ensemble Villa Musica) (MDG)
Schubert
Chamber Music for Violin (Edith Peinemann) (Bayer)
Piano Trios (Odeon Trio) (RCA, Pro Arte, Capriccio)
Trout Quintet; Nottorno (Ensemble Villa Musica) (Naxos)
Schubertiade 1977 – Vienna (Odeon Trio, Hermann Prey) (ATW)
Schumann
Sonatas, Op. 105 and 121; Romances No. 1–3, Op. 94 (Charles Neidich) (Sony)
Spohr, Volkmann
Piano Trios (Odeon Trio) (Impression)
Strauss
Piano Trios (Odeon Trio) (Capriccio)
Tanejev, Tcherepnin
Piano Trios (Odeon Trio) (RCA, Pro Arte)
Weber
Grand Duo Concertant, Op. 48, 7 Variations op. 33 (James Campbell) (Marquis Classics)
Music in the Salzburg Mozart House
(Eberhard Finke, Rudolf Klepač/Fortepiano) (Amadeo)

Lieder
Beethoven
Complete Songs (Hermann Prey, Pamela Coburn) (Capriccio)
Cornelius
Christmas Songs, Vaterunser (Hermann Prey) (Deutsche Grammophon)
Mendelssohn, Liszt, Franz, Wagner
Romantic Songs (Hermann Prey) (Philips)
Schubert
Die schöne Müllerin (Hermann Prey) (Philips)
Schwanengesang (Hermann Prey) (Deutsche Grammophon)
Schubertiade Hohenems 1977 (Vocal Ensembles) (Deutsche Grammophon)
Songs (Edda Moser) (EMI)
Schubert, Schumann, Brahms, etc.
Love Songs (Hermann Prey) (Denon)
Schubert, Schumann, Brahms
Songs (Grace Bumbry) (EMI)
Schubert, Schumann
Songs, Dichterliebe (Hermann Prey) (Philips)
Schumann
Dichterliebe; Liederkreis, Op. 24 (Hermann Prey) (Denon)
Liederkreis, Op. 39; Kerner-Lieder (Hermann Prey) (Denon)
Songs (Hermann Prey) (Philips)
Silcher
Songs (Hermann Prey) (Deutsche Grammophon)
Strauss, Debussy
Songs (Roberta Peters) (MPS)
Weber
Songs (Hermann Prey) (EMI)
Wolf
Songs (Hermann Prey) (Philips)
Die liebe Seligkeit – Folksongs (Hermann Prey) (Deutsche Grammophon)
Baroque Songs and Arias (Hermann Prey, Eduard Melkus) (Philips)
Viennese Songs from Schubert's Time (Hermann Prey) (Deutsche Grammophon)

References

External links
Interview with Leonard Hokanson, November 13, 2000

1931 births
2003 deaths
20th-century classical musicians
20th-century classical pianists
20th-century American pianists
20th-century American male musicians
American classical pianists
American male classical pianists
Academic staff of the Frankfurt University of Music and Performing Arts
Jacobs School of Music faculty
Clark University alumni
Musicians from Maine
Military personnel from Maine
People from Vinalhaven, Maine
Bennington College alumni
United States Army soldiers